Jook-sing noodles is a rare type of Cantonese noodle found in some parts of Hong Kong, Macau, and some parts of Canton in Guangdong province, China.

Description
The noodle is made with eggs, traditionally made with duck egg, and is considered one of the rarer noodles in existence.  Historically the chef rides a bamboo log to press the eggs, flour, and other ingredients together. As of 2008 in Hong Kong, only a few restaurants are left that make the noodles in the traditional manner.

Use in dishes
One of the noodle's most popular combinations in a dish is jook-sing wonton noodles.

References

Chinese noodles